Frederico Fischer (born 6 January 1917) is a Brazilian athlete. He is the current Masters M90 and M95 world record holder in the 100 metres.

Early life
Fischer was born in Ribeirão Preto, São Paulo on 6 January 1917. He was of German ancestry, with his father moving to Brazil in 1909, becoming successful in selling prepared meats. His older brother was born in Germany (and lived to almost 100 years old). Fischer also has a sister who, as of the last report, was still alive at age 99 in 2012.  During World War I his family was ostracized when Brazil joined the war, causing a move to Jaguariaíva where his father drowned in the river.  Frederico grew up in Pompeia, São Paulo, taking care of the family while his mother worked in a factory.  As he got older he played football as a goalie with the club in Santo Amaro and rode bicycles.  When his brother built a boat, he joined and took up sailing joining the Club de Regatas Tietê.  Frederico got his first job in a pig iron factory at age 15, but studied to be an accountant which became his career.

Athletics
In his mid 20s he drifted into the sport of Athletics, became the regional champion in the 400 metres hurdles and decathlon, chasing the records of Sylvio de Magalhães Padilha training two to three times a week.  But when he asked for time off work to compete at a higher level, his boss gave him the ultimatum, "You choose, your enjoyment or your job," he chose his job.

He married his wife, Teresa in 1947.  She still supports his endeavors.  In that era, athletes were expected to stop playing sports by age 40, "because it was too dangerous for the heart."  But he remained active with his athletics club.  While working as a director of a ceramics factory in Mauá, his club sponsored a run for distance runners.  Frederico joined in.  Sitting in a car after the run he realized perspiration, getting the blood circulating, all of problems he wanted to solve became clearer.  He got more active.  His group was approached by a group from Chile led by Hernán Figueroa, who were trying to start a veteran athlete group.  Frederico joined in 1973, by 1975 he was president of the  Athletic Association Veterans of São Paulo.

Fischer began attending the World Masters Athletics Championships starting in 1979, in Hannover, Germany.  He says he has become addicted to the competition.  It was fourteen years later in Carolina, Puerto Rico when his gold medal haul started with five wins at 100 metres, 200 metres, 400 metres, shot put and discus. He turned 100 in January 2017.

References

1917 births
Living people
Brazilian centenarians
Brazilian decathletes
Brazilian male discus throwers
Brazilian male hurdlers
Brazilian male shot putters
Brazilian male sprinters
Brazilian masters athletes
World record holders in masters athletics
Brazilian people of German descent
Men centenarians
Sportspeople from São Paulo (state)
20th-century Brazilian people
21st-century Brazilian people